List of notable Irish buildings includes buildings in Ireland that are currently in-use which are landmarks of historical, cultural or governmental significance. For ruins, see National monuments of Ireland.

 Albert College Building, Dublin, 1851
 Aldborough House and The Lord Amiens Theatre, Dublin, 1795
 American Embassy, Dublin
 Áras an Uachtaráin, Dublin
 Ardbraccan House, Co. Meath
 Blarney Castle, Co Cork
 Busaras, Dublin
 Carton House, Co. Kildare
 The Casino at Marino, Dublin
 Clarion Hotel, Limerick City
 Christ Church Cathedral, Dublin
 City Hall, Dublin
 College Green, Dublin
 Convention Centre Dublin
 The Custom House, Dublin, 1791
 Dr Steevens' Hospital, Dublin, 1733
 Dublin Castle
 Farmleigh, Irish state guesthouse
 The Four Courts, Dublin
 General Post Office or GPO, Dublin
 Government Buildings, Dublin
 Grand Canal Theatre, Dublin
 Headfort House, Kells, County Meath
 The Incorporated Law Society, previously The Blue Coat School, Blackhall Place, Dublin, 1783
 The Old Parliament House to 1800
 Iveagh House, Dublin
 Kilkenny Castle, Kilkenny, Co Kilkenny
 Kilmainham Jail, Dublin
 King's Inns, Dublin
 Leinster House, Dublin
 Liberty Hall, Dublin
 Malahide Castle, County Dublin
 Mansion House, Dublin
 St. Doulagh's Church, Dublin, built in the 5th century, renovated in the 12th century
 St. Mary's Church, Dublin, 1627
 St. Michan's Church, Dublin, 1095
 Muckross House, Co Kerry
 The National Aquatic Centre, Dublin
 The National Concert Hall, Dublin
 St. Nicholas' Collegiate Church, Galway, Co. Galway
 St. Patrick's Cathedral, Dublin
 St. Stephens' Church, Dublin - better known to Dubliners as "The Pepper Canister".
 Powerscourt House and demesne, Co. Wicklow
 Powerscourt Townhouse Centre, Dublin
 Riverpoint, Limerick City
 Russborough House, Co. Wicklow
 The Rotunda Hospital, Dublin, 1757
 The Helix, Glasnevin, Dublin
 Royal Hospital Kilmainham, Dublin
 Thoor Ballylee, Co. Galway
 Trinity College Dublin

See also
 Market Houses in the Republic of Ireland
 National monuments of Ireland

External links
 Irish Architecture Online - comprehensive photo and data on buildings throughout Ireland
Dataset comprising photographic documentation of 444 buildings in Dublin, Ireland. A UCD Digital Library Collection.

 *